Solanum albidum is a species of nightshade that is native to western South America, from southern Ecuador to northern Argentina, and grows well at mid elevations in the Andes. Common names include lumo (Ecuador)  huaritar (Peru) and lavaplato plateado (Bolivia). It can be either a shrub or small tree. The plant has dull yellow berries  in diameter.

References

albidum
Plants described in 1813
Flora of Argentina
Flora of Bolivia
Flora of Ecuador
Flora of Peru